Bursera is a genus with about 100 described species of flowering shrubs and trees varying in size up to  high. It is the type genus for Burseraceae. The trees are native (often for many species endemic) to the Americas, from the southern United States south through to northern Argentina, in tropical and warm temperate forest habitats.
It is named after the 17th-century Danish botanist Joachim Burser.

Several Mexican species (such as B. aloexylon and B. delpechiana) produce a type of wood known as linaloe (from Mexican Spanish , from Latin). They contain the aromatic oil linalool.

A number of species from tropical Asia were once included in this genus, but are now treated in the genus Protium.

The Bursera graveolens tree (Also known as Palo Santo) belongs to this genus.

Species 

list sources :

Formerly placed here
Canarium paniculatum (Lam.) Benth. ex Engl. (as B. paniculata Lam.)
Protium serratum (Wall. ex Colebr.) Engl. (as B. serrata Wall. ex Colebr.)

Uses
 Caranna, medicinal gum

Gallery

References

External links

 
Burseraceae genera